Eyal Barkan (Hebrew:  אייל ברקן) is an Israeli trance/nitzhonot producer.  He has collaborated with Yahel.  In 2003 he was reported to be Israel's top-selling trance DJ, with sales of over 150,000 albums. His albums have reached Gold status in Israel.

Barkan has also worked with his brother Oren, the duo recording as Reverse Psychology.

His 2003 album V.I.P. was released by Tiësto's Black Hole Records.

Discography

Albums
 Good Morning Israel (1998), Eyal Barkan Music
 Crazy Summer (1999), Hed Arzi Music - album credited to Eyal Barkan, but all tracks credited to Reverse Psychology
 Mr. Club Trance  (2000), Eyal Barkan Records/Hed Arzi Music - most tracks credited to Reverse Psychology
 On-Line (2002), Hed Arzi Music
 V.I.P.  (2003), Black Hole/In Trance We Trust

Singles
"Crazy Summer" (radio edit) (1999), Eyal Barkan Records/Good Morning Israel/Hed Arzi Music
"Viagra" (radio edit) (2000), Eyal Barkan Records/Good Morning Israel
"Voyage" (2000), In Trance We Trust - Yahel & Eyal Barkan
"Revolution" (2002), In Trance We Trust - Eyal Barkan & A-Force
Album Sampler (2003), In Trance We Trust

References

Living people
Israeli psychedelic trance musicians
Year of birth missing (living people)